Capital Talk is the flagship political talk show broadcast on Geo News. Hosted by Hamid Mir, Capital Talk looks at the challenges, issues and concerns facing Pakistan on a daily basis. The format includes several guests who participate in a dialogue on a topic related to current affairs. It is broadcast four days a week (Monday to Thursday) on Geo News.

History 

Launched in 2002, it is the oldest current events program in Pakistan. The first guest at the show was Makhdoom Ameen Faheem with whom the first host Hamid Mir discussed the 2002 Pakistan general election. Special transmissions are also broadcast focusing on crises zones, more important ones of which took place during Long March of 2009.

In December 2007, the show was banned by General Pervez Musharraf due to Mir's constant criticism of the Government. The show returned in January 2008 but was hosted by Muhammad Malik instead of Hamid Mir. After the General Election of 2008, Mir returned to Capital Talk.

In October 2012, Capital Talk completed its 10 years of running. This was celebrated by Geo News by running a special episode of the program.

Few of the famous political figures which have been interviewed include General Pervez Musharraf, Asif Zardari, Nawaz Sharif, Jemima Khan, Imran Khan, Chaudhry Shujaat, Hillary Clinton and Condoleezza Rice.

Removal and return of Hamid Mir 
In May 2021, after journalist Asad Ali Toor was attacked by masked men, Hamid Mir supported him and criticized Pakistan's military establishment of censoring the media and persecuting journalists. On May 30, 2021, Mir was banned from Geo News and it was reported that he would no longer host the Capital Talk show. On March 8, 2022, Hamid Mir returned to Capital Talk after the ban was lifted.

See also
GEO News
Urdu News

References

Capital talk with Hamid mir

Geo News
Pakistani television talk shows